Kisan may refer to:

 Kisan people, a tribal people of India
 Kisan language (disambiguation), several languages
 Kisan (caste), a Hindu caste in India
 Kisan (film), 2006 Indian Malayalam-language film
 Kisaan, 2009 Indian film  by Puneet Sira
 KISAN, Kus Indian Sut Asla Nicaragua ra (Nicaraguan Coast Indian Unity)
 Kisan, Bethlehem Governate, a Palestinian village in the Bethlehem Governorate
 Kišan (1786–1854), Qing Chinese official